China Railway Nanchang Group, officially abbreviated as CR Nanchang or CR-Nanchang, formerly, Nanchang Railway Administration is a subsidiaries company under the jurisdiction of the China Railway (formerly the Ministry of Railway). It supervises the railway network within Jiangxi and Fujian. The railway administration was reorganized as a company in November 2017.

Hub stations
 Nanchang
 , 
 Yingtan
 
 Fuzhou
 
 Xiamen
 ,

References

Rail transport in Jiangxi
Rail transport in Fujian
China Railway Corporation